Campania Island is an island on the coast of the Canadian province of British Columbia. It is located south of Prince Rupert, east across Hecate Strait from Haida Gwaii. To the west of Campania Island, across Estevan Sound, is the Estevan Group archipelago. Banks Island lies to the northwest, across Nepean Sound, and Pitt Island lies to the north across Otter Channel. To the northeast, across Squally Channel, is Gil Island, and to the east is Princess Royal Island, across Campania Sound. To the south of Campania Island is Caamaño Sound, beyond which is Aristazabal Island.

Campania Island was named in 1792 by the Spanish explorer Jacinto Caamaño, who explored the region in the corvette Aranzazu. Caamaño named the island Compañia and that spelling was used for the maps made by George Vancouver. Over time the spelling was changed to Campania.

References

Islands of British Columbia
North Coast of British Columbia
Tsimshian